This is a list of television programs broadcast by Boomerang in the United States.

Current programming 
This is a list of programs currently airing on Boomerang's schedule as of February 2023. A few of the programs are being run concurrently with Cartoon Network. An asterisk (*) indicates that the program is also airing on MeTV.

Reruns of ended original programming

Programming from Cartoon Network

Programming from Hanna-Barbera, Turner and Warner Bros.

Programming from Warner Bros. Animation

Current programming blocks

Digital content 
A list of shows that, so far, have only been made available on Boomerang's SVOD subscription service.

Programming from Cartoon Network

Programming from Hanna-Barbera, Turner and Warner Bros.

Programming from Warner Bros. Animation

Former programming 
A list of shows that have formerly ran on Boomerang. It does not include specials that are often part of a programming block. An asterisk (*) indicates that the program is now on Boomerang's SVOD subscription service. Two asterisks (**) indicates that the program is now airing on MeTV.

Original programming

Programming from Cartoon Network

Programming from Hanna-Barbera, Turner and Warner Bros.

Programming from Warner Bros. Animation

Programming from The Program Exchange

Other acquired programming

Former programming blocks

Former interstitial series

See also 
 List of programs broadcast by Cartoon Network
 List of programs broadcast by Cartoonito
 List of programs broadcast by Adult Swim
 List of programs broadcast by Toonami
 Boomerang

Notes

References 

Boomerang
Cartoon Network-related lists